Dorcadion multimaculatum is a species of beetle in the family Cerambycidae. It was described by Pic in 1932. It is known from Turkey.

References

multimaculatum
Beetles described in 1932